Nakonechny or Nakonechnyi, Russian Наконечный, Ukrainian Наконечний, feminine: Nakonechnaya, is a surname. The Polish-language variants are Nakoneczny, Nakonieczny (feminine: Nakonieczna).

It may refer to:
Dmitry Nakonechny
Mykola Nakonechnyi
Petro Nakonechnyi
Vitaliy Nakonechnyi
Yevhen Nakonechny

See also
 
 

Ukrainian-language surnames
Polish-language surnames